Bruno Timm (10 June 1902, in Berlin – 15 December 1972) was a German cinematographer.

Selected filmography
 Destiny (1921)
 Wrath of the Seas (1926)
 The Woman on the Rack (1928)
Land Without Women (1929)
 Die kleine Veronika (1929)
 Storm in a Water Glass (1931)
 Girls to Marry (1932)
 Modern Dowry (1932)
 The Escape to Nice (1932)
 Two in a Car (1932)
 All for Love (1933)
 A Song for You (1933)
 The Tsarevich (1933)
 Must We Get Divorced? (1933)
 Bashful Felix (1934)
 Between Two Hearts (1934)
 The Four Musketeers (1934)
 Heaven on Earth (1935)
 Forget Me Not (1935)
 Königstiger (1935)
 Game on Board (1936)
 Men, Animals and Sensations (1938)
 Search for Majora (1949)
 Madonna in Chains (1949)
 The Tiger Akbar (1951)
 Rose of the Mountain (1952)
 Lady's Choice (1953)
 Love's Awakening (1953)
 Dutch Girl (1953)
 The Charming Young Lady (1953)
 Josef the Chaste (1953)
 The Beautiful Miller (1954)
 Liane, Jungle Goddess (1956)
 It Happened Only Once (1958)

Bibliography
 Jung, Uli & Schatzberg, Walter. Beyond Caligari: The Films of Robert Wiene. Berghahn Books, 1999.

External links

1902 births
1972 deaths
German cinematographers
Film people from Berlin